Touchstone is a bimonthly conservative ecumenical Christian publication of the Fellowship of St. James. It is subtitled A Journal of Mere Christianity, which replaced A Journal of Ecumenical Orthodoxy.

Touchstone was started in 1986 as a Chicago-area newsletter and gradually expanded into a quarterly, and is currently published six times a year. It covers matters related to Christianity, culture, literature, secularism, and world affairs.  The subtitle of the journal is a reference to C. S. Lewis' concept of "mere Christianity".  The publication describes its approach as both theologically conservative and ecumenical. It has won the Associated Church Press's Award of Excellence (first place) for journals for 2004, 2005, 2006, 2007 and 2008, as well as six or seven other awards each year, including awards for articles, its book review section, and editorial courage.

The magazine's executive editor (since January 1992) is James Kushiner (Orthodox). Senior editors include Anthony Esolen, Robert P. George, James Hitchcock, and Leon J. Podles (all Catholic); S. M. Hutchens and Russell D. Moore (both Protestant); and Patrick Henry Reardon (Orthodox). From 2003 to 2008 its editor was David Mills (Catholic).

Touchstone has published two books based on some of its essays: Signs of Intelligence: Understanding Intelligent Design (2001) and Creed and Culture: A Touchstone Reader (2003).

References

External links

Mere Comments, the Touchstone Magazine editors' blog
The Fellowship of St. James website

Christian magazines
Magazines established in 1986
Bimonthly magazines published in the United States
Magazines published in Chicago
Conservative magazines published in the United States
Religious magazines published in the United States